Youssef Joundy (also spelled Youssef El Joundy, Arabic: يوسف الجندي) is a Moroccan actor. He is married to journalist Houria Boutayeb.

Partial filmography

Films 
 Makanch 3la bal
 Des amis du Canada 
 The Bitter Orange
 Les oubliés de l'histoire (2010)

Television 
 Sla w Slam (2020)

References

External links 
 

Moroccan male actors
Living people
Year of birth missing (living people)